FC Titus Lamadelaine is a former football club, based in Luxembourg. In 2015 it folded as it merged with CS Pétange to form Union Titus Pétange.

References

Defunct football clubs in Luxembourg
Pétange
Association football clubs established in 1910
2015 disestablishments in Luxembourg
1910 establishments in Luxembourg